Ranks and insignia of the Military of Serbia and Montenegro were the military insignia used by the Armed Forces of Serbia and Montenegro. The Military of Serbia and Montenegro used the same military ranks insignia as Yugoslav People's Army, with some ranks abolished. The same ranks and insignia system was used both before and after the constitutional reforms of 2003, before which the military held the name "Military of Yugoslavia". When the union of Serbia and Montenegro was dissolved, the two new armies created new systems of ranks and insignia.

Cap Badges

Officers
The rank insignia of commissioned officers.

Other ranks
The rank insignia of non-commissioned officers and enlisted personnel.

See also
 Yugoslav People's Army Ranks
 Serbian military ranks and insignia

References

External links
 

Military ranks of Yugoslavia